Joanna Moncrieff is a British psychiatrist and academic. She is Professor of Critical and Social Psychiatry at University College London and a leading figure in the Critical Psychiatry Network. She is a prominent critic of the modern 'psychopharmacological' model of mental disorder and drug treatment, and the role of the pharmaceutical industry. She has written papers, books and blogs on the use and over-use of drug treatment for mental health problems, the mechanism of action of psychiatric drugs, their subjective and psychoactive effects, the history of drug treatment, and the evidence for its benefits and harms. She also writes on the history and politics of psychiatry more generally. Her best known books are The Myth of the Chemical Cure and The Bitterest Pills.

Career
Moncrieff qualified in medicine from the University of Newcastle upon Tyne in 1989. She trained in psychiatry in London and southeast England during the 1990s, becoming an MRCPsych in 1994. In 2001 she received an MD (in the United Kingdom, an advanced research doctorate) from the University of London. From 2001 for 10 years she was the consultant for a psychiatric rehabilitation unit for people with severe and enduring mental disorders. She works as a consultant in adult community psychiatry at the North East London NHS Foundation Trust, and she is Professor of Critical and Social Psychiatry at University College London, having previously been a senior lecturer in the Division of Psychiatry. She is also currently the Principal Investigator for the NIHR-funded RADAR (Research into Antipsychotic Discontinuation And Reduction) study.
Dr Moncrieff is a founding member and the co-chairperson of the Critical Psychiatry Network. This is a group of psychiatrists from around the world who are sceptical of the idea that mental disorders are simply brain diseases and who campaign to reduce the influence of the pharmaceutical industry and find alternatives to narrow, medical model based practice.

Professor Moncrieff stood in the Ingatestone, Fryerning and Mountnessing: Brentwood council election in 2021 and 2022 as the Labour Party candidate, but was not elected.

Research and writing

The role of drugs in modern psychiatry
Moncrieff's work challenges the idea that drugs or medications have specific effects on underlying diseases or abnormalities. She is known for challenging the theory that mental disorders are caused by chemical imbalances. She shows that there is little evidence for serotonin abnormalities in depression, or dopamine abnormalities in psychosis or schizophrenia. She traces the history of the idea that psychiatric drugs are magic bullets and she explores the role of the pharmaceutical industry, the psychiatric professional and the state in fostering this model. She has documented the increasing rates of prescriptions of psychiatric drugs over the last decade, and analysed the way the pharmaceutical industry has created conditions like adult ADHD and the ‘new bipolar disorder’ to help market these drugs.

Models of drug action
Moncrieff is not completely opposed to the use of drugs for mental health problems, but believes that the action of drugs in these situations is misunderstood. Moncrieff developed two alternative 'models' for understanding what drugs might be doing when they are prescribed to people with mental health problems. The current mainstream understanding of psychiatric drug action is based on a 'disease-centred' model that suggests that drugs work by rectifying the underlying abnormality that is presumed to lead to the symptoms of the disorder in question. Moncrieff contrast this with an alternative 'drug centred' model, which suggests that since psychiatric drugs are psychoactive substances, they work because they change the way people think, feel and behave. According to this model, psychiatric drugs have no specific biological effects in people with a mental disorder, and they produce their characteristic effects in everyone who takes them. The changes induced by some sorts of drugs may, however, lead to the suppression of the manifestations (symptoms) of some mental disorders.  The Myth of the Chemical Cure traces the emergence and development of the disease-centred model from the 1950s onwards. It highlights the lack of evidence for the disease-centred model of drug action for every major class of psychiatric drug. It also explores the commercial, professional and political interests behind the disease-centred model.

Antidepressants
Moncrieff has written several papers criticising the methodology of antidepressant research. She did a Cochrane meta-analysis of the small group of trials of antidepressants that compared them with an 'active' placebo containing a drug used to mimic some of the side effects of the antidepressants used. She has published one of the few papers that describes the psychoactive effects of modern antidepressants and their association with suicidal ideation, and with physical effects.

Together with Dr. Mark Horowitz, Moncrieff in 2022 conducted the first systematic umbrella review of the evidence for the serotonin "chemical imbalance" theory of depression, which suggests that the evidence does not support the hypothesis.

Antipsychotics
The Bitterest Pills traces the history of antipsychotic drugs from the introduction of chlorpromazine in the 1950s. The book also looks at recent developments, including the marketing of antipsychotics through the Early Intervention movement, and the promotion of a new and expanded concept of bipolar disorder. Moncrieff also describes the cultural development of the new concept of bipolar disorder, which she refers to as ‘the medicalisation of "ups and downs"’. Research by Moncrieff and colleagues described and compared the subjective or psychoactive effects of different antipsychotics. This included publication in the controversial and non-peer reviewed Medical Hypotheses.

Lithium
In early work Moncrieff analysed the evidence for the efficacy of lithium. She claimed there was no evidence that lithium was superior to other sedatives for the treatment of acute mania, and that lithium's efficacy in preventing a relapse of manic depression was due to the adverse effects caused by the sudden withdrawal of lithium. In later work she showed that studies on the outcome of lithium treatment in the real world fail to demonstrate useful or worthwhile effects, and suggest it may even worsen the outcome of manic depression.

Other drugs
Moncrieff has critically reviewed the literature on the use of drug treatments like acamprosate and naltrexone for alcohol problems and the use of stimulants in children.

History and politics of psychiatry
Moncrieff has developed a political analysis of the drivers of modern mental health theory and practice and explored the influence of neoliberalism. She has published papers on the historical context of the emergence of modern drug treatment, the history of psychiatric thought in the 20th century  and of ‘rapid tranquilisation’ in psychiatry, as well as her books on the history of drug treatments.

Books
 The Myth of the Chemical Cure: a critique of psychiatric drug treatment, Palgrave, 2008. 
 A Straight Talking Introduction to Psychiatric Drugs, PCCS Books, 2009. 
 The Bitterest Pills: the troubling story of antipsychotic drugs, Palgrave, 2013.

References

External links 

British psychiatrists
Living people
Academics of University College London
British women psychiatrists
Year of birth missing (living people)